The Big U (1984) is a novel by American writer Neal Stephenson. His first published novel, it is a satire of campus life.

Plot  
The story chronicles the disillusionment of a number of young intellectuals as they encounter the realities of the higher education establishment parodied in the story. Over time their lives and sanity disintegrate in different ways through a series of escalating events that culminates with a full-scale civil war raging on the campus of American Megaversity.

Told in the first person from the perspective of Bud, a lecturer in Remote Sensing who is new to the university, the book attacks and makes fun of just about every conceivable group at university, though its portraits of the nerds/computer scientists/role players tend to be more detailed than those of other factions.

The events take place at a fictitious big university consisting of a single building (a central complex with eight towers containing student housing), making the university an enclosed universe of its own. Stephenson uses this fact to take what starts as a mostly realistic satire and move it further and further into the realm of improbability, with giant radioactive rats, hordes of bats and a lab-made railgun.

The book was written while Stephenson attended Boston University. The  fictional campus' design is based on a BU dormitory,  Located at 700 Commonwealth Avenue in Boston, Massachusetts, it is one of the largest dorms in the US.  The character of President Septimius Severus Krupp shares a number of similarities with then–BU President John Silber, although his name—like those of his predecessors as president of the big U—is taken from the Roman Emperor Septimius Severus.  The neon Big Wheel sign plays a part reminiscent of the Boston Citgo sign just east of the BU campus in Kenmore Square.

Literary significance and criticism
Stephenson has said he is not proud of this book.  When Stephenson's Snow Crash was published in 1992, the book that became a best-seller and vaulted him to fame, The Big U was out of print and Stephenson was content to leave it that way.  When original editions began selling on eBay for hundreds of dollars, he relented and allowed The Big U to be republished, saying that the only thing worse than people reading the book was paying that much to read it.

Connections to Stephenson's later work
 Julian Jaynes' theory of the bicameral mind used by Stephenson in this novel to explain the behavior of some of the cult-like student groups is an important part of the plot of Snow Crash.
 The idea of institutions of learning also serving as repositories of nuclear waste reappears in Anathem.

See also
 The Origin of Consciousness in the Breakdown of the Bicameral Mind

References

Sources
 

1984 American novels
1984 science fiction novels
Campus novels
Novels by Neal Stephenson
1984 debut novels
American satirical novels